Stanley Robert Henry Fisher (4 February 1911 – 16 March 1961) was an Australian rules footballer who played with Hawthorn in the Victorian Football League (VFL).

Notes

External links 

1911 births
1961 deaths
Australian rules footballers from Victoria (Australia)
Hawthorn Football Club players